1987–88 in Argentine football saw Newell's Old Boys win the Argentine championship, their first title since 1974. In the Copa Libertadores 1987 River Plate and Independiente were eliminated at the semi-final stage.

League table

Newells Old Boys qualified for Copa Libertadores 1988 as champions of Argentina.
Teams highlighted in light blue qualified for the Liguilla Pre-Libertadores.

Top Scorers

Relegation

Unión de Santa Fe and Banfield were relegated with the worst points averages.

Liguilla Pre-Libertadores
Quarter-finals

Semi-finals

Final

San Lorenzo qualify for Copa Libertadores 1988.

Argentine clubs in international competitions

References

Argentina 1987-1988 by Javier Roimiser ' at rsssf.
Argentina 1980s by Osvaldo José Gorgazzi and Victor Hugo Kurhy at rsssf.
Copa Libertadores 1987 by Frank Ballesteros and Karel Stokkermans'' at rsssf.